Tabrian or Tabariyan or Tabryan may refer to:

 Tabrian, Faruj, a village in North Khorasan Province, Iran
 Tabarian, Shirvan, a village in North Khorasan Province, Iran
 Tabari people, a people in the north of Iran
 Tabari language or Mazanderani, spoken mainly in Iran's Mazandaran, Tehran and Golestan provinces

See also 
 Tabaristan, the area of modern-day Mazanderan and Gilan during the Arab conquest of Iran
 Gilaki and Mazandarani (disambiguation)
 Mazanderani (disambiguation)